L'Anneau du pêcheur ("the ring of the fisherman") is a 1995 novel by the French writer Jean Raspail. The narrative has two timelines: the time of Benedict XIII, the last antipope of the Avignon Papacy, and contemporary times, when the Catholic Church tries to discover Benedict's successor, as it turns out that his line of papacy has continued in secret throughout the centuries. The book received the Prix Maison de la Presse and the Prince Pierre Foundation's Literary Prize.

References

External links
 L'Anneau du pêcheur at the publisher's website 

1995 French novels
French alternate history novels
Avignon Papacy
French-language novels
Novels by Jean Raspail
Catholic novels
Novels set in the 14th century
Novels set in the 15th century
Éditions Albin Michel books